Nonhyeon Station is an underground metro station on Seoul Subway Line 7 and the Shinbundang Line, located in Nonhyeon-dong, Gangnam-gu, Seoul.

Station layout

Vicinity
 Nonhyeon Elementary School
 Yeongdong Market
 Banpo Police Station
 Hakdong Park

Seoul Metropolitan Subway stations
Metro stations in Gangnam District
Railway stations opened in 2000